Tommaso Caracciolo, C.R. (died 1665) was a Roman Catholic prelate who served as Archbishop of Taranto (1637–1665) and Titular Archbishop of Cyrene (1631–1637).

Biography
Tommaso Caracciolo was ordained a priest in the Congregation of Clerics Regular of the Divine Providence. On 10 November 1631, he was appointed during the papacy of Pope Urban VIII as Titular Archbishop of Cyrene. On 14 December 1631, he was consecrated bishop by Giulio Savelli, Archbishop of Salerno. On 20 September 1636, he was selected as Archbishop of Taranto and confirmed on 30 March 1637 by Pope Gregory XIII.
He served as Archbishop of Taranto until his death in 1665.

While bishop, he was the principal co-consecrator of Carlo Antonio Agudio, Bishop of Castellaneta (1650).

See also
Catholic Church in Italy

References

External links and additional sources
 (for Chronology of Bishops) 
 (for Chronology of Bishops)  

17th-century Italian Roman Catholic archbishops
Bishops appointed by Pope Urban VIII
1665 deaths
Clerics regular
People from Taranto
Theatine bishops